Gantheaume Point is a promontory about  from Broome, Western Australia.

It was named on 24 July 1801 for Honoré Joseph Antoine Ganteaume, by Nicolas Baudin during the Baudin expedition to Australia: this was a French expedition to map the coast of Australia, then known as New Holland.

There are outcrops of Broome Sandstone, deposited in shallow water in this area in the Early Cretaceous period, about 130 million years ago. Footprints from dinosaurs of that time, and plant fossils, are preserved in the sandstone. At very low tide, dinosaur footprints can be seen about  out to sea.

References

External links
Broome Visitor Centre

Rock formations of Western Australia
Headlands of Western Australia
Kimberley coastline of Western Australia
Broome, Western Australia